Alfred Powis, OC (September 16, 1930, Montreal, Canada – October 10, 2007, Toronto, Canada) was a Canadian businessman. After graduating from Westmount High School, he earned a BComm degree from McGill University. At McGill University, Powis was a member of the Delta Kappa Epsilon fraternity's Tau Alpha Chapter. After graduation in 1950, Powis first went to work as an investment analyst at Sun Life Assurance. In 1950, he joined Noranda Mines where he eventually became its president and CEO in 1968 and chairman in 1977.

Alfred Powis was inducted into the Order of Canada in 1984, the Canadian Business Hall of Fame in 1995, and the Canadian Mining Hall of Fame in 1997.

References

 

1930 births
2007 deaths
Anglophone Quebec people
Businesspeople from Montreal
Canadian mining businesspeople
McGill University Faculty of Management alumni
Officers of the Order of Canada
Canadian chief executives